Gilles Ngomo Michée (born 23 August 1987) is a Cameroonian professional football who plays as a midfielder.

Club career
Gil was born in Yaoundé, Cameroon.

AS Khroub
In June 2008 Gil joined AS Khroub.

CS Constantine
On 8 August 2011, Gil signed a two-year contract with Algerian club CS Constantine. On 10 September 2011, Gil made his debut for CS Constantine as a starter in a league match against JSM Bejaia. He played the entire match as CS Constantine won 0-0.

CR Belouizdad
In June 2014 Gil joined signed a two-year contract with Algerian club CR Belouizdad.

References

External links
 
 http://www.csconstantine.net/les-nouvelles/les-nouvelles/gilles-ngomo-serai-partant-du-csc-!.html
 http://www.csc-sanafir.ch/l1pro/index.php?option=com_joomleague&view=player&p=1%3Aligue-1&tid=1%3Acs-constantine&pid=19%3Agilles-ngomo&Itemid=27
 http://www.camfoot.com/?foudre-d-akonolinga-secouee-par,7065.html

1987 births
Living people
Association football midfielders
Cameroonian footballers
Cameroonian expatriate footballers
Algerian Ligue Professionnelle 1 players
Canon Yaoundé players
AS Khroub players
CR Belouizdad players
CS Constantine players
Abha Club players
Cameroonian expatriate sportspeople in Algeria
Expatriate footballers in Algeria
Expatriate footballers in Saudi Arabia
Cameroonian expatriate sportspeople in Saudi Arabia
Saudi First Division League players
Cameroon international footballers